Tatsuya Shinhama (born 11 July 1996) is a Japanese speed skater who is specialized in the sprint distances.

Career
In March 2018 Shinhama won the gold medal at the 500m and 1000m events of the World University Speed Skating Championships  in Minsk, Belarus. At the first competition weekend of the 2018–19 ISU Speed Skating World Cup in Obihiro, Japan in March he finished third in the first 500m event. At the second competition weekend in Tomakomai, Japan he won both 500m events, his first victories on the World Cup circuit.

Personal records

References

External links

1996 births
Living people
Japanese male speed skaters
World Sprint Speed Skating Championships medalists
Speed skaters at the 2022 Winter Olympics
Olympic speed skaters of Japan
21st-century Japanese people